Long Twilight is a 1997 Hungarian drama film directed by Attila Janisch. It was screened in the Contemporary World Cinema section of the 1997 Toronto International Film Festival.

Cast
 Mari Törőcsik as öregasszony
 Imre Csuja as Buszsofõr
 András Fekete as Sofõr
 János Katona as Teherautósofõr
 Gábor Máté as Múzeumigazgató
 József Szarvas as útitárs

References

External links
 

1997 films
1997 drama films
Hungarian drama films
1990s Hungarian-language films